This is a list of members of the South Australian Legislative Council between 1997 and 2002. As half of the Legislative Council's terms expired at each state election, half of these members were elected at the 1993 state election with terms expiring in 2002, while the other half were elected at the 1997 state election with terms expiring in 2006.

 Terry Cameron was elected as a Labor MLC, but resigned from the party in August 1998 to support the sale of ETSA. He served as an independent until 25 March 1999, when he founded the SA First party.
 Trevor Crothers was elected as a Labor MLC, but resigned from the party in June 1999 to support the sale of ETSA. He served out the remainder of his term as an independent.
 Labor MLC George Weatherill resigned on 1 September 2000. Bob Sneath was appointed to the resulting casual vacancy on 4 October 2000.

References

 "Statistical Record of the Legislature, 1837–2007", Parliament of South Australia, 2007.
 "History of South Australian Elections, 1857–2006", Dean Jaensch, 2006.

Members of South Australian parliaments by term
21st-century Australian politicians
20th-century Australian politicians